St Aloysius' Anglo-Indian High School is a Christian mission school in the city of Visakhapatnam, Andhra Pradesh, India. It was founded in the year 1847, during the East India Company rule in India by the British Indian Army. The school was started for the purpose of educating British Indian Army European soldiers' children.

About

St. Aloysius'  was the first English medium school in the Andhra Pradesh. During the Colonial period, it was the only English-medium education school between Chennai and Kolkata.

References 

Christian schools in Andhra Pradesh
Education in Visakhapatnam
Educational institutions established in 1847
Schools in Visakhapatnam district
Uttarandhra
1847 establishments in India